The men's K-1 500 metres event was an individual kayaking event conducted as part of the Canoeing at the 1996 Summer Olympics program that took place at Lake Lanier.

Medalists

Results

Heats
26 competitors first raced in three heats. The top three finishers from each of the heats advanced directly to the semifinals with the rest competing in the repechages.

Repechages
The top four finishers from each of the repechages along with the fastest fifth-place finisher advanced to the semifinals.

Semifinals
The top four finishers in each of the two semifinals along with the fifth fastest advanced to the final.

Final
The final was held on August 4.

References
1996 Summer Olympics official report Volume 3. p. 166. 
Sports-reference.com 1996 men's K-1 500 m results
Wallechinsky, David and Jaime Loucky (2008). "Canoeing: Men's Kayak Singles 500 Meters". In The Complete Book of the Olympics: 2008 Edition. London: Aurum Press Limited. p. 470.

Men's K-1 500
Men's events at the 1996 Summer Olympics